Huang Wei-yi (born 11 September 1985 in Yilan, Republic of China) is a Taiwanese football striker who currently plays for Tatung F.C. He comes from Atayal tribe.

In 2006 FIFA World Cup qualification games, he scored 3 goals, which were the only goals received by Chinese Taipei. In 2000, Huang started playing for the Ilan Youth soccer team, for which he capped 22 times and scored 10 goals.

On August 13, 2005, Huang was transferred to Tatung F.C. after his talents were noticed when playing for the Chinese Taipei National Football League.

Career Honours
Tatung F.C.
 Winner
Chinese Taipei National Football League: 2005, 2006
CTFA Cup: 2005

External links

1985 births
Living people
Atayal people
Taiwanese footballers
Tatung F.C. players
People from Yilan County, Taiwan
Association football forwards
Chinese Taipei international footballers